Christopher Stevens (born November 29, 1967), is an American record producer, mix-engineer, songwriter and multi-instrumentalist based in Nashville, Tennessee.

Early and personal life
Stevens was born Christopher Edmund Stevens, on November 29, 1967, in Eugene, Oregon. He graduated from North Eugene High School and studied electronics at Lane Community College. After working as a composer for video games in the 1990s, Stevens eventually relocated to Nashville, Tennessee to pursue songwriting and record production full-time.

Credits awards and accomplishments

Chris Stevens has produced and mixed contemporary Christian music artists TobyMac, and American Idol finalists Mandisa and Colton Dixon, among others. Stevens has also worked on projects for country artists Blake Shelton and Carrie Underwood. In September 2013 Stevens traveled to Barcelona, Spain, to work with International pop star Shakira on her 2014 studio album, lending his programming talents on several of her songs. He has also contributed his skills on two studio albums, Nothing Left to Lose, and Just Kids, for fellow Oregonian and Universal Republic recording artist Mat Kearney.

Stevens has handled production, writing, and mixing for numerous artists under the EMI CMG, Word Records, Provident, INO Records, Gotee Records, and Curb Records labels. Stevens is credited with programming and keyboards on the Carrie Underwood single "Cowboy Casanova".

In 2010, Stevens produced two Grammy nominated albums, TobyMac's, Tonight, and Sanctus Real's Pieces of a Real Heart. In 2011, Stevens received his first songwriting Grammy nomination for Jamie Grace's Hold Me. In 2010 and 2012, Stevens was honored as BMI's Christian Songwriter of the Year. In 2013 Stevens received his first Grammy as a producer and mixer on TobyMac's Eye on It. In 2014 Stevens took home two more Grammys for Contemporary Christian Album for Mandisa's Overcomer and Contemporary Christian Song for its title song. In June 2015 he received his third BMI Christian songwriter of the year award. In February 2016, Stevens was awarded his fourth Grammy for production and engineering on Tobymac's This Is Not a Test.

In January 2020 Stevens earned his fifth Grammy award in the roots gospel category for production on Gloria Gaynor's album, Testimony.

Beginning in 2016 Stevens began focusing on songwriting in the pop and country genres and has had songs recorded by Jason Aldean, Lindsay Ell, David Lee Murphy, Kenny Chesney, Justin Moore, Morgan Wallen, Drew Baldridge, and Logan Mize. In June 2018, Stevens celebrated his first number one Billboard and Mediabase Country Song with David Lee Murphy's "Everything's Gonna Be Alright", featuring Kenny Chesney. Stevens co-wrote the song with Murphy and Jimmy Yeary, and produced the background track.

References

External links
 

1967 births
Living people
American performers of Christian music
Record producers from Oregon
Record producers from Tennessee
Songwriters from Oregon
Songwriters from Tennessee
Musicians from Eugene, Oregon
Musicians from Nashville, Tennessee
Businesspeople from Eugene, Oregon